Herman Thomas Marie Ledeganck (2 February 1841 – 17 November 1908) was a Belgian diplomat and colonial administrator who served as vice governor-general of the Congo Free State from 1888 until 1889. Ledeganck was born in Zomergem the son of a Flemish poet.

Career 
Ledeganck entered the foreign service and served as a consul-general first at Batavia in the Dutch East Indies and later at Cologne in Germany before he was picked to serve as deputy to Governor-General Camille Janssen in the Congo. He was appointed on 31 January 1888, embarked at Lisbon for the Congo on 6 February and arrived at Boma on 1 March. He had a large workload in the Congo, but he offered his resignation on 1 January 1889. Leaving the administration in the hands of the inspector-general, Henri Gondry, he embarked at Banana on 17 April and landed in Europe on 19 May. 

In 1893 Ledeganck became consul-general and chargé d'affaires in Venezuela and in 1895 consul-general and chargé d'affaires in Siam. In 1899, he became consul-general and chargé d'affaires at Buenos Aires and also resident minister for the Belgian government to the governments of Argentina, Paraguay and Uruguay. In 1908 he was consul-general in Tunis with responsibility for Algeria, Tunisia and Tripolitania. He died while in Tunis.

For his services, Ledeganck became a commander of the Order of Leopold and holder of the Civic Cross of either the 1st or 2nd class. He also became a Grand Officer (2nd class) of the Order of the Liberator of Venezuela and Knight Commander (2nd class) of the Order of the Crown of Siam.

Notes

 Herman Ledeganck, Royal Museum for Central Africa

1841 births
1908 deaths
Belgian diplomats
Congo Free State officials
Recipients of the Civic Decoration
People from East Flanders